Nobori (昇) is a one-kanji surname from the Amami Islands of southern Japan. Notable people with the surname include:

 Shomu Nobori (昇 曙夢, 1878–1958), Japanese translator and educator

See also
 Amami name

Amami surnames